A themed walk is a type of informal learning and often is defined by a walk along which there are information boards or other identifying codes (e.g. QR codes) covering a specific topic or theme such as history, geology or forestry.  An academic discipline or school subject can define a theme. A walk can consist of one or more themes. Whilst themed walks are often designed to encourage walking, educational paths and nature trail tend to be aimed more at educating or training.

Themes 
For nature-based themes, paths may be several kilometres long and may be used both for educational purposes and recreation. They may connect places, buildings or natural features that have a  particular theme in common by a signed route, but may also have specifically positioned exhibits.

For science themes, informal learning provides ways to engage in diverse settings. For themes related to the nature, features of nature (e.g. raised bogs or biotopes) or of geology may be laid out as special educational paths.

For themes related to mathematics or physics, these walks provide objective interpretation of physical objects encountered en route.

Management 
Municipal authorities or local societies may be responsible for their establishment and maintenance. Other walks are managed by individuals who are highly knowledgeable in a theme, and host theme-based tours.

Examples 
In Austria there are more than 300 themed walks. These paths are intended to give summer tourism in the Alps a new impulse, but are also helping to improve the network of footpaths.

See also 
 Barefoot trail
 Boston Freedom Trail
 Educational trail
 Math walk (US)
 Footpath
 Sculpture trail
 Theme park
 Trail

References

External links 
 Math walk

Hiking
Environmental interpretation